Nankusia Shyam  is a Gond artists who carry forward Janagarh Kalam — the new school of Gond art created by her husband Jangarh Singh Shyam (1962–2001).

Early life 
Shyam is brought up in the village Sonpuri of Madhya Pradesh. Later she was married to Gond artist Jangarh Singh Shyam.

Career
Shyam started her painting under the guidance of her husband Jangarh Shyam who encouraged her to carry the legacy of Gond art with her own expression. In 2011 when her husband committed suicide she took up this art more seriously. Later she works in Kala Bhavan an art museum in Bhopal as an assistant artist. After her husband's death she is working in Bharat Bhavan, Bhopal where her husband used to work.

Style and themes 
Shyam paints animals remembering her childhood period. She draws her memory of urban culture through the shape of those animals. Her painting usually based on bright vibrant colour and prominent impression of Gond art.

Exhibition
Shyam had her exhibition in the cities of Delhi, Jaypur and Bhopal and with other exhibitions in the state of Kerala. She had her International exhibition in Japan, France, Sri Lanka and in the UAE.

Books
Bulli and the Tiger- a book for children where Shyam had illustrated birds, animals and trees through dots.

Awards
Shyam had received a state-level award from Madhya Pradesh Hasta Shilpa Vikas Nigam in 2002.

References 

Living people
21st-century Indian women artists
Indian women painters
People from Madhya Pradesh
Year of birth missing (living people)